Eilica is a genus of ground spiders that was first described by Eugen von Keyserling in 1891.

Species
 it contains twenty-eight species:
Eilica albopunctata (Hogg, 1896) – Australia (South Australia, Queensland)
Eilica amambay Platnick, 1985 – Brazil, Paraguay
Eilica bedourie Platnick, 1985 – Australia (Queensland)
Eilica bicolor Banks, 1896 – USA to Honduras, Cuba, Jamaica
Eilica bonda Müller, 1987 – Colombia
Eilica chickeringi Platnick, 1975 – Panama
Eilica cincta (Simon, 1893) – West, Central Africa
Eilica contacta Platnick, 1975 – Australia (Queensland, New South Wales)
Eilica daviesae Platnick, 1985 – Australia (Queensland)
Eilica fusca Platnick, 1975 – South Africa
Eilica giga FitzPatrick, 1994 – Zimbabwe
Eilica kandarpae Nigam & Patel, 1996 – India
Eilica lotzi FitzPatrick, 2002 – South Africa
Eilica maculipes (Vellard, 1925) – Brazil
Eilica marchantaria Brescovit & Höfer, 1993 – Brazil
Eilica modesta Keyserling, 1891 (type) – Brazil, Uruguay, Argentina
Eilica mullaroo Platnick, 1988 – Australia (Victoria)
Eilica myrmecophila (Simon, 1903) – Peru, Argentina
Eilica obscura (Keyserling, 1891) – Brazil
Eilica platnicki Tikader & Gajbe, 1977 – India
Eilica pomposa Medan, 2001 – Brazil, Argentina
Eilica rotunda Platnick, 1975 – Australia (Queensland)
Eilica rufithorax (Simon, 1893) – Venezuela, Brazil
Eilica serrata Platnick, 1975 – Australia (Queensland, Western Australia)
Eilica songadhensis Patel, 1988 – India
Eilica tikaderi Platnick, 1976 – India
Eilica trilineata (Mello-Leitão, 1941) – Argentina, Chile, Brazil
Eilica uniformis (Schiapelli & Gerschman, 1942) – Argentina

References

Araneomorphae genera
Cosmopolitan spiders
Gnaphosidae
Taxa named by Eugen von Keyserling